The 2023 Asian Women's Volleyball Championship would have been the 22nd edition of the Asian Women's Volleyball Championship, organized by Asia's governing volleyball body, the Asian Volleyball Confederation (AVC) hosted in the Thailand.

Qualification
Following the AVC regulations, The maximum of 16 teams in all AVC events will be selected by
1 team for the host country
10 teams based on the final standing of the previous edition
5 teams from each of 5 zones (with a qualification tournament if needed)

Qualified teams
The AVC stated that there were originally fourteen entrant teams that were due to participate in the tournament.

Pools composition
Teams were seeded in the first two positions of each pool following the Serpentine system according to their previous edition. AVC reserved the right to seed the hosts as heads of pool A regardless of the previous ranking. All teams not seeded were drawn to take other available positions in the remaining lines. Each pool had no more than three teams from the same zonal association. The draw was held in Bangkok, Thailand on March 16, 2023.

Ranking from the 2019 Asian Women's Volleyball Championship was shown in brackets except the host and the teams who did not participate, which were denoted by (–).
Pots

After the draw

Preliminary round

Pool A 

|}

All times are Thailand Standard Time (UTC+07:00).
|}

 Pool B 

|}

All times are Thailand Standard Time (UTC+07:00).
|}

Pool C 

|}

All times are Thailand Standard Time (UTC+07:00).
|}

Pool D 

|}

All times are Thailand Standard Time (UTC+07:00).
|}

Women's volleyball
Women's volleyball competitions